Buddo Island (also known as Dingi)';  is a small island located in the Arabian Sea off the coast of Karachi in Sindh province of Pakistan.
On island dense Tamer forest present.

Pakistan Islands Development Authority 
Buddo Island is part of $50 billion development of city under Pakistan Islands Development Authority.

World Wide Fund for Nature-Pakistan (WWF-P)

See also 
 List of islands of Pakistan
 Bundal Island

References

External links
 Pakistan agrees $43bn development

Islands of Karachi
Islands of Sindh